Citibank Argentina is a commercial bank and financial services company operating as a wholly owned subsidiary of New York-based Citigroup. Its banking operations are the tenth largest in Argentina. In October 2016, Citibank reached an agreement to sell its retail banking operations in Argentina to Banco Santander Río.

Overview

Citibank Argentina was established in 1914 as the Buenos Aires branch of the National City Bank of New York, and the first of any United States bank in Argentina. The bank remained a secondary name in Argentine banking; but earned renown for the quality of its services: its Paylink payment processing network made it the first bank in Argentina to earn an ISO 9000 (1997), and in 2002, Citiservice y Citiphone Banking earned the institution an ISO 9002 certification. The company has sponsored a number of local programs to encourage reading among children.

The president of Citicorp Argentina during the 1990s, H. Richard Handley, had been raised in Argentina with the chairman of Citigroup at the time, John S. Reed, and obtained his support for the bank's lucrative participation in the 1990 sale of the state telephone concern ENTel. Under bank president Carlos Fedrigotti, the bank acquired Buenos Aires-based Banco Mayo in 1998, stabilizing the insolvent institution's finances, and doubling Citibank's network.

Losses registered during the Argentine economic crisis prompted an investigation in 2004 by the SEC,

The bank issues an array of credit cards, including Diners Club, Visa, and MasterCard (with American Airlines AAdvantage). Its acquisition of the Provencred lending bank in 1999 expanded Citibank's reach into the moderate income market, though Provencred was ultimately sold to the local Banco Comafi in 2009.

Citibank Argentina maintains 60 branches, US$2.2 billion in deposits, and a loan portfolio of US$1.4 billion (around 3% of the domestic market in each).

Headquarters 

The headquarters of Citibank Argentina, at Bartolomé Mitre 502, are in the heart of the Buenos Aires financial district, and face the offices of the Bank of the Province of Buenos Aires and Banco Santander Río, two of its largest competitors. The building, notable for its Art Deco façade and main hall, was designed by Luis Aberastain Oro and Lyman Dudley, and completed in 1929. The building was also known in its early decades for the Club Americano, a social club located on the top floor, and popular with Buenos Aires' sizable American expatriate community.

References

Banks of Argentina
Banks established in 1914
Citigroup
Commercial buildings completed in 1929
Buildings and structures in Buenos Aires
1914 establishments in Argentina
Argentine subsidiaries of foreign companies